The 2011 Allerdale Borough Council election took place on 5 May 2011 to elect members of Allerdale Borough Council in Cumbria, England. The whole council was up for election and the council stayed under no overall control.

Results
The results saw the Labour Party make 6 gains to win exactly half of the 56 seats on the council, 1 short of a majority. Labour gains included the former leader of the council, Mark Fryer, who took Stainburn ward from the Conservatives by 2 votes. The Conservatives lost 5 seats to have 12 councillors, including losses in All Saints Cockermouth and Broughton St Bridgets. 16 independents were elected, including gains in Broughton St Bridgets and Netherhall Maryport. No other party won any seats on council, with the Liberal Democrats losing 2 seats in Harrington Workington as the party was wiped out. Overall turnout for the election was 46.19%.

Following the election Labour said it intended to take control of the council as a minority administration replacing the previous alliance between the Conservatives, Liberal Democrats and 7 independents.

3 Conservative, 3 independent and 1 Labour  candidates were unopposed.

By ward

References

2011 English local elections
2011
2010s in Cumbria
May 2011 events in the United Kingdom